George Hiscock (1874–1962) was an English bowls player who competed at the British Empire Games.

Bowls career
He participated in the 1938 British Empire Games at Sydney in the fours/rinks event and finished in fifth place.

Personal life
He was a relieving officer for the London County Council by trade and lived in Fulham.

References

English male bowls players
Bowls players at the 1938 British Empire Games
1874 births
1962 deaths
Commonwealth Games competitors for England